Klaus Farbmacher (born 10 September 1946) is an Austrian biathlete. He competed in the 20 km individual event at the 1976 Winter Olympics.

References

1946 births
Living people
Austrian male biathletes
Olympic biathletes of Austria
Biathletes at the 1976 Winter Olympics
Sportspeople from Innsbruck